Saul, or Shaul, was the first king of the united Israel and Judah.

Saul may also refer to:

Biblical figures
 Paul the Apostle, called Saul of Tarsus before his conversion
 Saul, a king of Edom

People

 Saul (given name), a list of people
 Saúl Berjón (born 1986), Spanish footballer known as Saúl
 Saúl Fernández (born 1985), Spanish footballer known as Saúl
 Saúl Ñíguez, Spanish footballer playing for Atlético Madrid,  known as Saúl
 Saul (surname), a list of people

Places
 Saül, French Guiana, a commune
 Saul, County Down, Northern Ireland, a townland and civil parish
Saul Monastery, 5th-century monastery near Saul
 Saul, Gloucestershire, England, a village
 Saul, Kentucky, United States, an unincorporated community

Arts and media
 Saul (Handel), a 1738 oratorio by Handel
 Saul (Alfieri), a 1782 tragedy by Vittorio Alfieri
 Saul (comics), a Marvel Comics character
 Saul Karath, a character in the role-playing game Knights of the Old Republic

Television
 Saul Bennett, in the Australian soap opera Home and Away
 Saul Berenson, in the American political-thriller series Homeland
 Saul Goodman, in the American series Breaking Bad and its spinoff Better Call Saul
 "Better Call Saul" (Breaking Bad), an episode of Breaking Bad
 Better Call Saul, an AMC series spun off Breaking Bad
 Saul Malone, in the series Saul of the Mole Men
 Saul Tigh, in the re-imagined series Battlestar Galactica

Other uses
 Saul (band), a hard rock band formed in 2007
 Saul High School of Agricultural Sciences, Roxborough, Philadelphia, United States
 Mount Saul, a mountain in Washington state

See also
 Shaul